Jóhann Sigurðarson (born 21 April 1956) is an Icelandic actor, voice actor and singer. He is known for his role as Leifur in Trapped and The Minister.

Career 
Jóhann graduated from the Icelandic Drama School in 1981. He has been involved in numerous productions with the National Theatre of Iceland and Reykjavik City Theatre as well as starring in many Icelandic films. From 2000-2001 he studied singing in Italy. In 2008 he was awarded "Town Artist" from the town of Garðabær, Iceland. He has from time to time performed with the Icelandic Opera.

Selected filmography 
 101 Reykjavík (2000) as Páll
 Kaldaljós (2004) as Stranger
 Brúðguminn (2008) as Lárus
 Mamma Gógó (2010) as Bank Manager
 Trapped (2015-2016) (TV-series) as Leifur
 Blackport (2021) (TV-series) as Sólon

Video game roles 
 Banner Saga (2014) as Ubin
 Banner Saga 2 (2016) as Ubin

Music recording 
 Banner Saga Original Soundtrack (2014) by Austin Wintory
 "We are all Guests upon the Land"
 "Onward"
 The Banner Saga 3 (2018) by Austin Wintory
 "Darkness Rises"
 "Steel Flowing as Water"
 "Trees Cannot Grow in a Moonless Sky"

Personal life 
Jóhann's first wife was Anna Jóna Jónsdóttir, mother of Haraldur Ingi Þorleifsson. In 1988, a drunk driver drove into their car, killing Anna and seriously injuring Jóhann. He later married Guðrún Sesselja Arnardóttir, a district attorney. He has two sons, Örn Gauti and Jóhann Ólafur.

References

External links 
 

Living people
Johann Sigurdarson
Johann Sigurdarson
Johann Sigurdarson
Johann Sigurdarson
Johann Sigurdarson
1956 births